Wolf Rüdiger Hess (Heß in German script; 18 November 1937 – 24 October 2001) was a German architect, the only son of Rudolf Hess and Ilse Hess (née Pröhl).

Early life
Born in Munich, Hess lived with his parents until his father’s flight to Scotland on 14 May 1941. After that, his father was denounced by the Nazi government as "mentally ill", and this led his mother to leave Munich and take her son to live at the family’s house in the country, at Bad Oberdorf, a small spa village in the Allgäu Alps. There, young Wolf Rüdiger gained the lifelong nickname of "Buz". On 3 June 1947, Hess’s mother was arrested by Allied forces, together with all the wives of the other Germans convicted at Nuremberg, and she was interned at Augsburg-Göggingen camp. Hess then lived with an aunt until his mother’s release in March 1948. He began to attend a local high school in 1947 and then from the mid-1950s studied architecture, qualifying as an architect in 1961.

Campaigns
Hess gained prominence for criticising an investigation into his father's alleged suicide while serving a life sentence in Spandau Prison in Berlin. Hess maintained that the investigation was a cover-up, and that the British Secret Intelligence Service (SIS) had murdered him. He believed that they had done this to prevent his father's parole – which he believed to be imminent – because the British government was afraid that he would reveal embarrassing information about British actions during World War II. Wolf Rüdiger Hess and his father's lawyer, Alfred Seidl, arranged their own autopsy.

Hess wrote three books: My Father Rudolf Hess (1986), Who Murdered My Father, Rudolf Hess? (1989) and Rudolf Heß: Ich bereue nichts (Rudolf Hess: I regret nothing) (1994/1998). Hess was head of the "Rudolf-Heß-Gesellschaft e.V." before his death.

At the age of 63, Wolf Rüdiger Hess suffered a stroke and was taken to a Munich hospital, where he died. He left a widow and three children.

References

1937 births
2001 deaths
German neo-Nazis
Rudolf Hess
20th-century German architects
People from Munich